The Krupp Protze (officially L 2 H 43 and L 2 H 143) was a six-wheeled 6x4 German truck and artillery tractor produced between 1934 and 1941 and heavily used in World War II. It was powered by a 4-cylinder, 55 hp or, from 1936, 60 hp Krupp M 304 petrol engine. Its main purpose was to tow artillery, especially the 3.7 cm Pak 36 anti-tank gun (designated Kfz 69), and transport motorized infantry (designated Kfz 70).

This vehicle was extensively used on the Eastern Front, during the North African campaign and in France and Sicily. The "Krupp-Protze" was of relatively advanced design. Its fuel consumption was relatively high (24 Litres / 100 km on road) in comparison to the comparable Opel Blitz 1.5 t truck (16.5 liters / 100 km, produced 1938 - 1942).

Total production was about 7,000 units.

Variants
A successful design, the Krupp-Protze was converted into several variants:

Kfz.19 
Telephone truck
Kfz.21 
Staff car
Kfz.68 
Radio mast carrier
Kfz.69 
Standard configuration for towing the 3.7 cm Pak 36 anti-tank gun. Carried 2 in front with 4 in a pair of forward and rear facing seats.
Kfz.70 
Standard configuration for personnel carrying. carried 2 in front with 10 seated in the rear on benches.
Kfz.81 
Ammo carrier conversion for 2 cm FlaK anti-aircraft gun, usually towed
Kfz.83 
Generator carrier for anti-aircraft searchlight, usually towed
Sd.Kfz. 247 Ausf. A 
armoured personnel carrier, six-wheeled version, only 20 built in 1937; production went to Daimler-Benz, who built the Ausf. B four-wheeled version in 1941 and 1942.

Sometimes anti-tank (37 mm Pak 36) and anti-air (2 cm Flak) guns were mounted directly on the truck bed (Portée).

See also 
 List of World War II military vehicles of Germany
List of Sd.Kfz. designations

Notes

References

External links

Pictures at Olive-Drab.com
Pictures and technical data
Pictures of a Krupp-Protze carrying a PaK 36
Info and pictures about Krupp Protze

World War II vehicles of Germany
Military trucks of Germany
Military vehicles introduced in the 1930s
Military vehicles of Germany